Luis Alexis Flores Manzor (born February 12, 1982) is a Chilean retired footballer who played for many different clubs in Chile.

References

External links
 
 

1982 births
Living people
Chilean footballers
Cobresal footballers
Universidad de Chile footballers
Rangers de Talca footballers
O'Higgins F.C. footballers
Chilean Primera División players
Primera B de Chile players
Association footballers not categorized by position
People from Rancagua